The 1954 Bulgarian Cup Final was the 14th final of the Bulgarian Cup (in this period the tournament was named Cup of the Soviet Army), and was contested between CSKA Sofia and Slavia Sofia on 7 November 1954 at Vasil Levski National Stadium in Sofia. CSKA won the final 2–1, claiming their second national cup title.

Route to the Final

Match

Details

See also
1954 A Group

References

Bulgarian Cup finals
PFC CSKA Sofia matches
PFC Slavia Sofia matches
Cup Final